At the 2003 Southeast Asian Games edition, Gymnastics was divided into three sub-categories: artistic gymnastics, rhythmic gymnastics, and aerobics. The artistic gymnastics was held from December 5 to December 8, the rhythmic gymnastics from December 9 to December 11, and the aerobics gymnastics on December 12. All events were held at the Quan Ngua Sports Center, in Ha Noi, Vietnam.

Medalist

Artistic gymnastics

Men's events

Women's events

Rhythmic gymnastics

Aerobics gymnastics

Results

Artistic gymnastics

Men's events

Team all-around
December 5

Individual all-around
December 6

Floor
December 8

Pommel horse
December 8

Rings
December 8

Vault
Qualification
December 5

Final
December 8

Parallel bars
December 8

Horizontal bar
December 8

Women's events

Team all-around
December 5

Individual all-around
December 6

Vault
Qualification
December 5

Final
December 8

Uneven bars
December 8

Balance beam
December 8

Floor
December 8

Rhythmic gymnastics

Women's events

Team all-around
9 December

Team competition is only for countries with at least 3 participating/entries of gymnasts. Only gymnasts competing in at least 3 apparatus can compete for the all-around qualifications; with the top three highest scores counted. Team competition also served as qualification for the event finals. Three gymnasts per team compete on each event, and the best ten of the scores out of twelve scores count.

Individual all-around
10 December

Hoop
11 December

Ball
11 December

Clubs
11 December

Ribbon
11 December

Aerobics gymnastics

Single Men
12 December

Single Women
12 December

Mixed doubles
12 December

Trios
12 December

Medal table
Legend

References

External links
Official website (archived)

Gymnastics
2003
Southeast Asian Games
International gymnastics competitions hosted by Vietnam